SM U-14 or U-XIV was a U-boat or submarine of the Austro-Hungarian Navy during the First World War. She was launched in 1912 as the French  Curie (Q 87), but captured and rebuilt for service in the Austro-Hungarian Navy. At war's end, the submarine was returned to France and restored to her former name.

Curie was launched in July 1912 at Toulon and completed in 1914. At the outbreak of the First World War in August 1914, Curie was assigned to duty in the Mediterranean. In mid-December, Curies commander conceived a plan to infiltrate the Austro-Hungarian Navy's main base at Pola, but during the 20 December attempt, the vessel became ensnared in harbor defenses. Two Austro-Hungarian ships sank Curie, killing three of her crew; the remainder were taken prisoner.

The Austro-Hungarian Navy, which had a small and largely obsolete U-boat fleet, immediately began salvage efforts and succeeded in raising the lightly damaged submarine in early February 1915. After a refit, the boat was commissioned as SM U-14 in June, but had little success early in her career. When her commander fell ill in October, he was replaced by Georg Ritter von Trapp. U-14 was damaged by a depth charge attack in February 1916, and underwent an extensive modernization through November. Resuming duty under von Trapp, U-14 sank her first ship in April 1917, but had her most successful patrol in August, when she sank five ships—including , reportedly the largest cargo ship in the world—in a six-day span.

In January 1918, von Trapp was replaced as commander, but neither of his two successors was able to match his accomplishments. In all, U-14 sank 11 ships with a combined gross register tonnage of nearly 48,000 tons. Returned to France at the end of the war, she rejoined the French Navy in July 1919 under her former name of Curie. She remained in service until 1928 and was scrapped in 1929.

Design and construction 
Curie was a part of the 16-boat  authorized under the 1906 program. The Brumaire-class boats were diesel-powered versions of the steam-powered  submarines (which had been authorized the year before), and, like the Pluviôse boats, were named after either months of the French Republican Calendar or scientists. Curie was named after Pierre and Marie Curie.

The Bruimaire class was designed by French naval designer Maxime Laubeuf and featured a double hull. They had a displacement of  surfaced and  submerged. Curie, like the other 15 submarines of the class, featured one  bow torpedo tube and could carry as many as eight torpedoes. As built, Curie did not have a deck gun.

The Brumaire class featured twin propeller shafts driven by two French license-built MAN 6-cylinder diesel engines on the surface, or by two electric motors when submerged.

Curie was laid down at the Arsenal de Toulon and launched on 18 July 1912, completed by 1914, and commissioned into the French Navy.

French career and sinking 

Like all the Brumaire-class submarines, Curie began her First World War service in the Mediterranean, and was one of the first French submarines to appear in the Adriatic.

On 17 December 1914, Curie, at the insistence of her French-Irish commander Gabriel O'Byrne, departed her base in the Ionian Sea under tow by the French armored cruiser . Depositing her charge  from Pola, the site of the Austro-Hungarian Navy's main base, Jules Michelet departed, leaving Curie to proceed to the Austro-Hungarian base. Curie arrived the next day and began reconnoitering the entrance to the harbor. O'Byrne observed the entrance and exit paths of Austro-Hungarian vessels and plotted a course through the deployed defensive mines. On 19 December, O'Byrne took Curie in to observe the anti-submarine net that ran across the opening in a long, defensive breakwater built to keep submarines from infiltrating the naval base.

Believing that he had accounted for all of the defensive measures, O'Byrne took Curie to a depth of  early on 20 December and, attempting an incursion into the harbor, heard the sounds of chains and wires dragging on the submarine's hull. When the sounds stopped after half a minute, O'Byrne brought Curie up to periscope depth to discover that he had only penetrated the outer net. Curies forward momentum carried her into the second net where she became "inextricably entangled". When the submarine, still trapped in the net, was forced to surface for fresh air, Curie came under fire from the Austro-Hungarian destroyer  and torpedo boat Tb 63 T which quickly sank her. Three of the twenty-six men on board were killed in the attack; the survivors — who included Curies commander, O'Byrne — were all taken prisoner.

Salvage and Austro-Hungarian career 
At the beginning of the First World War, the Austro-Hungarian Navy's U-boat fleet consisted of six largely experimental submarines of three classes. The Navy had five larger, more modern submarines (what would have been the ) under construction in Germany at the outbreak of war, but when the Navy became convinced that delivery of the U-7 boats would be impossible, they were sold to Germany in November 1914.

Beginning on 21 December, the day after Curies sinking, salvage crews raised the submarine in stages, finally bringing her to the surface on 2 February 1915.

The former Curie, now assigned the designation U-14, was reconditioned and commissioned into the Austro-Hungarian Navy under the command of Korvettenkapitän Otto Zeidler on 1 June. Zeidler remained in command until he fell ill, and was replaced in mid-October by Linienschiffsleutnant Georg Ritter von Trapp. Under Zeidler's command and the first months of von Trapp's command, U-14 had no successes.

In early February 1916, U-14 joined  for a patrol near Durazzo. U-4 came closest to scoring a success when she narrowly missed hitting , a British  on 7 February. U-14 survived a depth charge attack, but made it back to port with all of her externally mounted torpedoes crushed and both fuel tanks leaking.

When she put in for repairs, U-14 was extensively modernized in a refit that kept her in port from February to November. The submarine was given a German-style conning tower that replaced the French-designed wet lookout platform.

On 28 April 1917, U-14 was patrolling off the coast of Greece when she scored her first success, Teakwood, a 5,315-ton British tanker headed from Port Arthur, Texas, to Port Said. On 3 May, on patrol in the same vicinity, von Trapp and U-14 sank another ship, this one the 1,905-ton Italian steamer Antonio Sciesa.

In another patrol in July, U-14 sailed on the north side of the island of Corfu while headed for Santi Quaranta, Albania. Because the harbor at Corfu was occupied by the French fleet at the time, U-14 conducted a ruse de guerre by flying the submarine's former national flag, the French tricolor, in order to pass unmolested. Even though U-14s new conning tower made her look unlike any other Brumaire-class boat, one French patrol plane was successfully fooled by the ruse. When U-14s crew first spotted the aircraft, flying towards them from the direction of the sun, there was not enough time to submerge. As the aircraft drew near, its French markings—and its cargo of bombs—became apparent to the crew. With no other course of action possible, U-14s crew waved their hats and handkerchiefs at the plane. As the French pilot passed overhead, he returned the waves, apparently unaware of the U-boat's true nationality. The only success by U-14 on this cruise was the sinking of Marionga Goulandris, a Greek steamer, near Cape Matapan.

U-14s next war patrol was very successful, sinking five ships with a combined tonnage of 24,814, over half of her total tonnage sunk. U-14 departed from the submarine base at Cattaro on 20 August and headed through the Straits of Otranto, successfully evading the Otranto Barrage, and Allied blockade of the passageway between Italy and Albania. The following day, U-14 sank Kilwinning, a British steamer loaded with coal and a general cargo headed for Port Said. Two days after that, the British steamer Titian was sunk by U-14 while on en route to Alexandria. U-14s next victim was the British  steamer Nairn. The 3,627-ton turret deck ship, on her way from Malta to Port Said with coal, was sunk on the night of 27/28 August  from Benghazi.

Milazzo, at 11,744 tons, was the largest ship sunk by U-14, and among the largest ships sunk by a U-boat in World War I. Milazzo, reported by The New York Times in 1916 as the largest cargo ship in the world, was the second-largest ship sunk by an Austro-Hungarian submarine. U-14 concluded her patrol on 1 September, when she returned to Cattaro.

U-14 sank three more ships during a five-day span in October. On 19 October, U-14 sank the British ship Elsiston  from Malta. One person aboard Elsiston, which was carrying military stores between Malta and Suda Bay, was killed in the attack. Nearby, and on the same day, von Trapp sank the 3,618-ton Good Hope, a British ship laden with iron ore for Middlesbrough. The next ship sunk by U-14 was the Italian steamer Capo di Monte, sunk  from Candia while on her way from Karachi to Malta.

In January 1918, Friedrich Schlosser replaced von Trapp as commander of U-14. Schlosser was, in turn, replaced in June by Hugo Pistel, who remained in command until the end of the war. Neither of the later commanders was able to duplicate von Trapp's success in U-14; the U-boat sank no more ships through the rest of the war.

After Austria-Hungary's surrender and the end of the First World War, U-14 was returned to France and on 17 July 1919 rejoined the French Navy under her former name of Curie. She was stricken in 1928 and scrapped in 1929.

Summary of raiding history

Notes

References

Bibliography 
 
 
 
 
 
 
 
 
 
 

1912 ships
Brumaire-class submarines
Ships built in France
Maritime incidents in December 1914
World War I shipwrecks in the Adriatic Sea
Lost submarines of France
Captured ships
Submarines of the Austro-Hungarian Navy
U-boats commissioned in 1915
World War I submarines of Austria-Hungary
World War I submarines of France